Georgina Pontaza (born 1974) is a Guatemalan actress, singer, choreographer, theater director and producer. She has done work on television and radio in addition to live theater and serves as the artistic director of both the Teatro Abril and Teatro Fantasía IRTRA in Guatemala City.

Biography
Karla Georgina Pontaza Ávila was born 15 January 1974 in Guatemala. At a very young age, she was encouraged to entertain in a children's choir founded by her grandmother, soprano Carmen Morales Ávila. From age 5, she performed and by age 9, Pontaza and her sister Silvia, who was 8-years-old, formed a singing and dancing duo, known as the "Pontaza Sisters". They performed with the Kodaly Group under the direction of Alma Monsanto in the production of Little Orphan Annie, in 1985, followed by "José el Soñador", "La Novicia Rebelde" (The Sound of Music), "Gatos" (Cats), "Brillantina" Glitter, "El Violinista en el Tejado" (Fiddler on the Roof), Evita, and many others.

She has a degree in both Advertising and Dramatic Arts, having graduated with the latter designation in 2009. Since the mid 1990s, she has taught children's theater. In addition to teaching, she has recorded many voices for both television and radio, and was the Artistic Director of "TV Chiquirrines Club".

Pontaza had her directorial debut in 1994, in the work "El reino de Bom Bom" (The Kingdom of Bom Bom), with the Argentine singer Luis Aguilé. In 1995 she started choreographing and directing children's theater and in the early 2000s she began directing with the producer Pedro Luis Soto at the Teatro Abril. By 2006 as artistic director, Pontaza had staged many classic children's theatrical performances.
In 2012, she became the artistic director of the newly opened Teatro Fantasía (Fantasy Theater) at the Instituto de Recreación de los Trabajadores (IRTRA) (Institute of Worker's Recreation) in Guatemala City.

Though best known for children's performances, Pontaza has also worked with classic productions like "Entremeses de Cervantes" by Miguel de Cervantes and "Cuadros de Costumbres" by Guatemalan José Milla y Vidaurre.

Awards
1994, Lifetime Achievement for Children's Theater, from the Magazine of the Nation for the Sociedad Dante Aliguieri

Productions

Acting
Peter Pan (1994, 1997, 2000) 
Pinocchio
The Diary of Anne Frank
The Wizard of Oz

Directing
The Little Mermaid
The Beauty and the Beast
Snow White
Aladdin
Fuenteovejuna
Los árboles mueren de pie
Leyendas de Guatemala

References

1976 births
Guatemalan stage actresses
Guatemalan women singers
Living people
North American child actors
20th-century Guatemalan actresses
21st-century Guatemalan actresses
21st-century women singers